Felicity-Franklin High School is a public high school in Felicity, Ohio. It is the only high school in the Felicity-Franklin Local Schools district.

References

External links
 District Website
 GreatSchools.net

High schools in Clermont County, Ohio
Public high schools in Ohio